Linda L. Restifo graduated from the University of Pennsylvania with an M.D. in 1984 and a Ph.D in Genetics in 1986. She is currently a professor at the University of Arizona of neuroscience, neurology, and cell biology, and she is a member of the BIO5 Institute. With her team, she works to understand normal brain development and the changes in that brain development that leads to cognitive disorders. She is known for her research into the brains of insects, particularly flies.

References

University of Arizona faculty
Perelman School of Medicine at the University of Pennsylvania alumni
American neuroscientists
American women neuroscientists
Living people
Year of birth missing (living people)
Place of birth missing (living people)
American women academics
21st-century American women